Ferocious Pal is a 1934 American adventure film directed by Spencer Gordon Bennet and written by Joseph Anthony Roach. The film stars Kazan the Wonder Dog, Ruth Sullivan, Gene Toler, Robert Seiter, Tom London and Harry Dunkinson. The film was released on February 2, 1934, by Principal Distributing.

Plot

Cast             
Kazan the Wonder Dog as Kazan
Ruth Sullivan as Patricia Boliver
Gene Toler as Johnnie 'Digs' Diggin
Robert Seiter as Dr. Tom Elliott 
Tom London as Dave Brownell
Harry Dunkinson as Sheriff Dick Williams
Henry Roquemore as Ebner Boliver
Edward Cecil as Sykes
Grace Wood as Martha Boliver

References

External links
 

1934 films
1930s English-language films
American adventure films
1934 adventure films
Films directed by Spencer Gordon Bennet
American black-and-white films
1930s American films